Rodney Douglas Dowhower (born April 15, 1943) is a former American football player and coach. He was the head coach at Stanford University and Vanderbilt University; in between he was the head coach of the Indianapolis Colts of the National Football League (NFL).

A graduate of Santa Barbara High School, Dowhower quarterbacked the Dons football team to the CIF Southern Section 4-A Division championship in 1960, defeating Centennial High School of Compton 19-6 at the Los Angeles Memorial Coliseum. Dowhower went on to star at San Diego State and later became an assistant for his coach Don Coryell, serving as Aztecs offensive coordinator for five seasons. When Coryell left to become head coach of the St. Louis Cardinals in 1973, Dowhower followed him and served one season as wide receivers coach. Returning to the college ranks, Dowhower served as offensive coordinator at UCLA for two seasons under Dick Vermeil, then spent one season in the same role at Boise State. 

In 1977, Dowhower became wide receivers coach for Stanford under new head coach Bill Walsh. After two seasons on staff, Dowhower was promoted to head coach at Stanford on January 9, 1979, a day after Walsh announced his departure to lead the NFL's San Francisco 49ers, After leading the Cardinal to a 5–5–1 record in 1979, he left in January 1980 to become the offensive coordinator for the NFL's Denver Broncos under head coach Red Miller. With a change in ownership in February 1981, Dan Reeves became the head coach the following month; Dowhower stayed on staff as the receivers coach.

Dowhower attended San Diego State University, where he played quarterback for the Aztecs. He served as an assistant coach at San Diego State, UCLA, and Boise State.  Dowhower was an assistant coach for seven NFL teams: the St. Louis Cardinals, Denver Broncos, Atlanta Falcons, Washington Redskins, Cleveland Browns (under Bill Belichick), New York Giants, and the Philadelphia Eagles.

Head coaching record

College

NFL

References

1943 births
Living people
American football quarterbacks
Atlanta Falcons coaches
Boise State Broncos football coaches
Cleveland Browns coaches
Denver Broncos coaches
Indianapolis Colts coaches
New York Giants coaches
Philadelphia Eagles coaches
San Diego State Aztecs football players
San Diego State Aztecs football coaches
St. Louis Cardinals (football) coaches
Stanford Cardinal football coaches
UCLA Bruins football coaches
Vanderbilt Commodores football coaches
Washington Redskins coaches
People from Ord, Nebraska
Sportspeople from Nebraska
Indianapolis Colts head coaches